Delhi Public School is a school located in Bopal, Ahmedabad, India. Established in 1995, it is an English medium school affiliated with CBSE. DPS Bopal is part of Kalorex.

The current principal is Ms. Sabina Sawhney

References

External links 
 Official website

Primary schools in India
High schools and secondary schools in Gujarat
Schools in Ahmedabad
Educational institutions established in 1996
1996 establishments in Gujarat